Lennox Constantine Gordon (born April 9, 1978) to Jamaican parents, is a former American football running back who played two seasons in the National Football League with the Buffalo Bills and Indianapolis Colts. He played college football at the University of New Mexico and attended Red Mountain High School in Mesa, Arizona.

As a sophomore at New Mexico in 1996, he rushed for 1,008 yards and 9 touchdowns, ranking 5th and 9th respectively in the Mountain West Conference in those categories that season.

References

External links
Just Sports Stats

1978 births
Living people
People from Maricopa County, Arizona
Sportspeople from the Phoenix metropolitan area
Players of American football from Arizona
African-American players of American football
American football running backs
New Mexico Lobos football players
Buffalo Bills players
Indianapolis Colts players
21st-century African-American sportspeople
20th-century African-American sportspeople